HD 47366 is the Henry Draper Catalogue designation for a star in the southern constellation of Canis Major. It has an apparent visual magnitude of 6.12, which puts it near the lower limit of stars visible to the naked eye. According to the Bortle scale, it can be viewed from dark rural skies.

This is a K-type giant star with a stellar classification of K1III: − the colon suffix indicates some uncertainty in the luminosity classification of III. Spectroscopic analysis of the star was used to derive an estimated mass of about 1.81 times the mass of the Sun. It has an estimated age of 1.6 billion years; old enough at that mass to have evolved off the main sequence. As a giant star, the atmosphere has expanded to 7.3 times the Sun's radius, and it is emitting 26 times the solar luminosity at an effective temperature of 4,772 K. The projected rotational velocity of the star is 4.3 km/s, indicating it is rotating with a period of under 86 days.

In 2016, a team of astronomers reported the detection of a pair of giant planetary companions. Radial velocity measurements indicated gravitational perturbations of the star being caused by orbiting objects. The best fit to the preliminary data suggests two periodicities: one almost exactly a year long like the Earth's periodicity, and a second of around two years. Both objects are predicted to have masses greater than that of the planet Jupiter: their minimum masses are 1.8 and 1.9 Jupiter masses, respectively. Until the inclination of their orbits is known, their actual masses cannot be pinned down more accurately.

Modelling of the orbits of the two planets showed that they are dynamically unstable on the life span of their host star unless they are in a 2:1 mean motion resonance or are on mutually retrograde orbits. In 2019, J. P. Marshall and associates proposed an orbital fit with lower eccentricities that is more stable. The new fit is closer to the 2:1 mean motion resonance. As the host star continues to evolve to a larger radius, it is expected that both planets will undergo orbital decay due to tidal forces and be engulfed.

References

External links
 

K-type giants
Planetary systems with two confirmed planets
Canis Major
2437
BD-12 1566
047366
031674